The 148th Regiment Illinois Volunteer Infantry was an infantry regiment that served in the Union Army during the American Civil War.

Service
The 148th Illinois Infantry was organized at Camp Butler, Illinois, and mustered into Federal service on February 21, 1865, for a one-year enlistment.  The 148th served in garrisons and operated against guerillas, first at Tullahoma, Tennessee, and alter along the line of the Nashville and Chattanooga Railroad.

The regiment was mustered out of service on September 5, 1865.

Total strength and casualties
The regiment suffered 2 enlisted men killed in action or mortally wounded, and 1 officer and 70 enlisted men who died of disease for a total of 73 fatalities.

Commanders
Colonel Horace H. Willsie - mustered out with the regiment.

See also
List of Illinois Civil War Units
Illinois in the American Civil War

Notes

References
The Civil War Archive

Units and formations of the Union Army from Illinois
Military units and formations established in 1865
1865 establishments in Illinois
Military units and formations disestablished in 1865